Antsirabe II is a rural district in Vakinankaratra Region, Madagascar. The district surrounds the urban district and city of Antsirabe. It also borders the district of Faratsiho to the north, Antanifotsy to the east and Betafo to the west, in addition to the region of Antanifotsy to the south. The district covers a total area of 2,471.31 km2, with a population estimated at 406,353 in 2013.

Communes
The district is further divided into 18 communes:

 Alakamisy
 Ambano
 Ambatomena
 Ambohibary
 Ambohidranandriana
 Ambohimiarivo
 Ambohitsimanova
 Andranomanelatra
 Antanambao
 Antanimandry
 Antsoatany
 Belazao
 Ibity
 Manandoana
 Mandrosohasina
 Mangatano
 Sahanivotry Mandona
 Soanindrariny
 Tsarahonenana Sahanivotry
 Vinaninkarena

References

Districts of Vakinankaratra